Ana Marcial (born 31 July 1953) is a Puerto Rican former swimmer. She competed in three events at the 1968 Summer Olympics.

References

1953 births
Living people
Puerto Rican female swimmers
Olympic swimmers of Puerto Rico
Swimmers at the 1968 Summer Olympics
Sportspeople from San Juan, Puerto Rico
Swimmers at the 1967 Pan American Games
Pan American Games medalists in swimming
Pan American Games bronze medalists for Puerto Rico
Medalists at the 1967 Pan American Games